is a Japanese manga series written and illustrated by Kotoyama. It has been serialized in Shogakukan's Weekly Shōnen Sunday since August 2019. In North America, the manga is licensed for English release by Viz Media. An anime television series adaptation produced by Liden Films aired from July to September 2022 on Fuji TV's Noitamina programming block.

In 2023, the manga won the 68th Shogakukan Manga Award for the shōnen category.

Plot
Unable to sleep or find true satisfaction in his daily life, Ko Yamori stops going to school and begins wandering the streets at night. He encounters a girl named Nazuna Nanakusa, a vampire who shows Ko the joys of being a night-walker. This results in Ko wanting to be a vampire as well, but in order to achieve his goal he must first fall in love with her.

Characters

Main

A fourteen-year old boy in his third year of junior high, who slowly finds himself unable to sleep because of his dissatisfying life. To reinvigorate himself, he slips out at night to walk the streets. Ko is trying to fall in love with Nazuna in order to become a vampire and leave his human life. It is later revealed that as he begins to develop more emotionally,  he can enter into a half-vampire state. This half-vampire state seems to be dependant on emotional or physical distress at first beginning happening as soon as blood is drawn either by blood-sucking or attack. Ko learns that slight pain, as small as an ear piercing, can activate the state as-well, Anko later gives Ko an ear piercing kit so that he can help in defending the group from increasing threats that begin to develop. Anko also believes that by entering this half-state repeatedly, Ko's vampire half will eventually take over his human half, or that as his love develops for Nazuna, the transition will complete.  Anko mentions that this is  all speculation at this point due to Ko and Nazuna's mere existence, that of which being Nazuna's having been born from a vampire and a human, and Ko's half-vampire transition. 

A "night-walker." She encounters Ko on his night out, then offers to stay with him at an abandoned building to free himself of his worries, where she then sucks his blood as he sleeps. She is very shy when it comes to love and gets embarrassed easily, but enjoys lewd jokes and teasing Ko. She also loves to drink beer. It is later shown that Nazuna's existence is a mystery to everyone involved. Thanks in part to this mystery, Nazuna does not know her exact age. She assumes that she has been around 30 to 40 years. She mentions her embarrassment with not being an older more classical vampire. Nazuna's life cycle is also not understood as revealed by Kabura. Kabura was forced, begrudgingly, to raise Nazuna and that she believes this discrepancy regarding her life cycle has something to do with her parents being a human and vampire.  Nazuna was left with Kabura by Nazuna's mother after her death giving birth. Nazuna's mother was the one that turned Kabura. Kabura is shocked to find Nazuna at a location given to her on a note, because she is completely identical to her mother, yet no older than around 4 years, possibly, unable to speak or feed herself, fully grown, calling into question her exact age. Kabura seems to suggest that a born vampire may age differently since bitten vampires are frozen in time. Nazuna having been born a vampire seems to have frozen at around the same age as Ko both mentally and physically, even though she has existed for 3 to 4 decades. It is also assumed that Nazuna might be the only vampire by birth currently known. She is kept at a distance from the main vampire group due to her stunted personality, lower intelligence and immaturity. No one knows what her birth could mean for the vampire world or what she is. Her age becomes a larger plot point when Anko reveals the way to kill vampires, which involves attaining a weakness item usually attached to a vampire's past. Anko starts using these items to maim vampires connected to the main group. Prior to Nazuna learning about her birth from Kabura, she confides in Ko that she may have fallen in love once but cannot remember as vampires slowly lose their memories upon being turned by their love interest. Once Anko's attacks begin with the weakness items, the group starts to hunt down and destroy their own items. Upon the revelation from Kabura that Nazuna was born a vampire, Nazuna and Ko come to the conclusion that she has no weakness. This assumption ends when Nazuna is attacked and wounded by one of the items. It is revealed to be her preserved umbilical cord kept by her father before he died, thus rectifying the missing parts of her history. Ko currently holds the item to protect it.

Humans

Ko's childhood friend, who lives in the same apartment complex as him.

A busy-body office worker and one of Nazuna's clients from her massage gig. After hearing about her struggles in life due to her heavy work schedule, Ko vows to help her, as he feels they share the same plight, and will offer to turn her into a vampire when he becomes one himself.

A popular boy at school, and one of Ko and Akira's old friends, who also hangs out at night.

Seri's vampire underling. He was saved by Ko, then later asked Seri to make him a vampire after Ko helped him and Seri understand their feelings for each other. He is often referred to as 'Draggo', or 'Menhera-san' in the manga.

 
A vampire-hunting detective. She is a heavy smoker. She was Nazuna's first attempt at creating a familiar when they were classmates at night school. The attempt failed because Anko did not meet the prerequisites to be turned. Later when Anko arrives home she is surprised by her family throwing her a birthday party. Her father gifts her a zippo lighter. Suddenly the lighter begins to agitate her father when he touches it, sending him into a frenzy resulting in him killing her mother. Anko understands immediately that the lighter has something to do with it and is able to pin her father down by forcing the lighter on him until the daylight destroys him. This incident causes her to loath vampires, kickstarting her hunting crusade. It is also revealed that her father was cheating on her mother potentially with the vampire Kiku Hoshimi.

Vampires

A flirtatious vampire who resembles a gyaru. She approaches Ko when she hears that Nazuna is spending the night with a human where she attempts to suck his blood, until she is stopped by Nazuna. The two do not get along well, as she questions why Nazuna is spending so much time with Ko while not having turned him yet.

A vampire who doubles as a teacher who teaches night classes. She is not as accepting of Ko in her first encounter with him, but becomes willing to let him stay with Nazuna so long as he fulfills his intentions on becoming a vampire and Nazuna continues to suck his blood.

A vampire who wears elegant dresses. She works as a nurse in a hospital and she is Nazuna's stepmother.

A long-sleeved shirt-wearing vampire who works in a maid cafe. She is very aware of her good looks leading her to seem a little self-absorbed in some situations.

A male vampire who appears feminine because of his slender body, shoulder-length hair, cute face, and choice of clothing.

A poorly understood vampire of an unknown age that suffers from extreme sociopathy turning hundreds of people into servants. There is a theoretical rule, never observed, that suggests if a vampire loves a human and bites them then the human dies. Kiku has been feverishly trying to test this rule to prove she has the emotions for love. Currently Mahiru is her next target.

Media

Manga
Call of the Night is written and illustrated by Kotoyama, his second manga series after Dagashi Kashi. It started in Shogakukan's shōnen manga magazine Weekly Shōnen Sunday on August 28, 2019. Shogakukan has collected its chapters into individual tankōbon volumes. The first volume was published on November 18, 2019. As of March 16, 2023, fifteen volumes have been published.

On July 3, 2020, Viz Media announced an English release of the manga in North America. The first volume was released on April 13, 2021.

Volume list

Anime
On November 11, 2021, a website opened to announce an anime television series adaptation produced by Liden Films. The series is directed by Tomoyuki Itamura, with Tetsuya Miyanishi serving as chief director, Michiko Yokote writing the series' scripts, Haruka Sagawa designing the characters, and Yoshiaki Dewa composing the music. It aired from July 8 to September 30, 2022, on Fuji TV's Noitamina programming block. Sentai Filmworks has licensed the series in North America, Europe, Oceania, and selected Latin American and Asian territories. The first season will consist of 13 episodes. At their Otakon panel in July 2022, Sentai Filmworks announced that the series would receive an English dub, which premiered on September 8, 2022.

Episode list
Michiko Yokote does the script on every episode, with Haruka Sagawa being the lead animation director.

Reception

Accolades
In 2020, the manga was nominated for the 6th Next Manga Awards and placed 7th out of the 50 nominees with 15,134 votes. The series ranked 8th on the "Nationwide Bookstore Employees' Recommended Comics of 2021" by the Honya Club website. In 2023, the series won the 68th Shogakukan Manga Award in the shōnen category, along with Ao no Orchestra.

Critical reception
In Anime News Networks Summer 2022 preview guide, contributors generally responded positively to the series, praising the narrative, unique take on the common trope of vampires, and high production value, comparing it favorably to the Monogatari series, which series co-director Tomoyuki Itamura had previously worked on at Shaft.

Notes

References

External links
 
 

2022 anime television series debuts
Anime series based on manga
Liden Films
Noitamina
Romantic comedy anime and manga
Sentai Filmworks
Shogakukan manga
Shōnen manga
Supernatural anime and manga
Vampires in anime and manga
Viz Media manga
Winners of the Shogakukan Manga Award for shōnen manga